The following is an incomplete list of fleshy fruits that may appear to be edible by humans, but are inedible. Because some of them are poisonous, others are merely too unpalatable for consumption.

Inedible fruits

 Abacá, Musa textilis (Musaceae)
 Alemow, Citrus macrophylla (Rutaceae)
 Alpine honeysuckle, Lonicera alpigena (Caprifoliaceae)
 Asparagus berries, Asparagus officinalis (Asparagaceae)
 Baneberry, Actaea pachypoda (Ranunculaceae) 
 Bittersweet, Celastrus scandens (Celastraceae)
 Black bryony, Dioscorea communis (Dioscoreaceae)
 Buckthorn, Rhamnus cathartica (Rhamnaceae)
 Canadian moonseed, Menispermum canadense' (Menispermaceae)
 Cassowary plum, Cerbera floribunda (Apocynaceae)
 Castor Bean, Ricinus communis (Euphorbiaceae)
 Ceylon durian, Durio ceylanicus (Malvaceae)
 Chinaberry, Actaea rubra (Ranunculaceae)
 Clusias, Clusia spp (Clusiaceae)
 Coyote melon, Cucurbita palmata (Cucurbitaceae)
 Cretan date palm, Phoenix theophrasti (Arecaceae)
 Crown flower, Calotropis gigantea (Apocynaceae)
 Deadly nightshade, Atropa belladonna (Solanaceae)
 Ensete, Ensete ventricosum (Musaceae)
 European holly, Ilex aquifolium (Aquifoliaceae)
 European spindle, Euonymus europaeus (Celastraceae) 
 Firethorn, Pyracantha angustifolia (Rosaceae) 
 Florida thatch palm, Thrinax radiata (Arecaceae)
 Fox head, Solanum mammosum (Solanaceae) 
 Glossy nightshade, Solanum americanum (Solanaceae)
 Golden dewdrop, Duranta erecta (Verbenaceae)
 Harlequin glorybower, Clerodendrum trichotomum (Lamiaceae) 
 Herb-paris, Paris quadrifolia (Melanthiaceae)
 Holly, Ilex spp. (Aquifoliaceae) 
 Honeybush, Melianthus major (Francoaceae)
 Honeyvine, Cynanchum laeve (Apocynaceae)
 Inca-peanut, Plukenetia volubilis (Euphorbiaceae)
 Ink berry, Dianella nigra (Asphodelaceae)
 Ivy, Hedera spp. (Araliaceae) 
 Japanese star anise, Illicium anisatum (Schisandraceae)
 Jatropha fruit, Jatropha curcas (Euphorbiaceae)
 Laurel, Prunus laurocerasus (Rosaceae)
 Lily of the valley, Convallaria majalis (Asparagaceae)
 Linden (also known as Lime or Basswood), Tilia spp. (Malvaceae)
 Manchineel, Hippomane mancinella (Euphorbiaceae)
 Mape tree, Inocarpus fagifer (Fabaceae)
 Masuri berry, Coriaria nepalensis  (Coriariaceae)
 Mezereum, Daphne mezereum (Thymelaeaceae) 
 Mistletoe (3 genera in the order Santalales)
 Osage-orange, Maclura pomifera (Moraceae)
 Opium poppy, Papaver somniferum (Papaveraceae)
 Paddy melon, Cucumis myriocarpus (Curcurbitaceae)
 Pangium edule, Pangium edule (Achariaceae)
 Poisonberry, Solanum dulcamara spp. (Solanaceae)
 Pokeweed, Phytolacca americana (Phytolaccaceae)
 Privet, Ligustrum spp. (Oleaceae)
 Rattlebox (Fabaceae)
 Redoul, Coriaria myrtifolia (Coriariaceae)
 Rosary pea, Abrus precatorius (Fabaceae)
 Sandbog death camas, Zigadenus glaberrimus (Melanthiaceae)
 Sausage tree, Kigelia africana (Bignoniaceae)
 Sea mango, Cerbera manghas (Apocynaceae}
 Silverbell, Halesia spp. (Styracaceae)
 Snowberry, Symphoricarpos spp. (Caprifoliaceae)
 Soapberry, Sapindus spp. (Sapindaceae)
 Sponge gourd, Luffa aegyptiaca (Cucurbitaceae)
 Strychnine tree, Strychnos nux-vomica (Loganiaceae)
 Suicide tree fruit, Cerbera odollam (Apocynaceae)
 Syringa berrytree, Melia azedarach (Meliaceae) 
 Tamanu, Calophyllum inophyllum (Calophyllaceae) 
 Thorn apple, Datura stramonium (Solanaceae)
 Tibetan dewberry, Rubus thibetanus (Rosaceae)
 Tickberry, Lantana camara (Verbenaceae)
 Tormentil, Potentilla erecta (Rosaceae)
 Trifoliate orange, Citrus trifoliata (Rutaceae)
 Tropical soda apple, Solanum viarum (Solanaceae)
 Tung tree, Vernicia fordii (Euphorbiaceae)
 Virginia creeper, Parthenocissus quinquefolia (Vitaceae) 
 Wahoo, Euonymus atropurpureus (Celastraceae)
 Weeping pear, Pyrus salicifolia (Rosaceae)
 Wild arum, Arum maculatum (Araceae)
 Wild cucumber, Marah macrocarpus (Cucurbitaceae)
 Wild olive, Olea oleaster (Oleaceae)
 Winter cherry, Solanum pseudocapsicum (Solanaceae)
 Yellow buckeye, Aesculus flava (Sapindaceae)
 Yellow oleander, Cascabela thevetia (Apocynaceae)
 Yew cones with seeds unremoved, Taxus'' spp. (Taxaceae)

See also 
 List of poisonous plants
 List of culinary fruits

Inedible
Fruits, Inedible